Pugachyov (also Pugachyov Southeast) is an air base in Saratov Oblast, Russia located 2 km north of Pugachyov. It is a minor but well-maintained military airfield.

Until October 2011 it was the base of the Russian 626th helicopter regiment.?

The base is home to the 626th Training Helicopter Regiment as part of the Zhukovsky – Gagarin Air Force Academy.

References

Airports built in the Soviet Union
Airports in Saratov Oblast
Soviet Air Force bases
Russian Air Force bases